The 1966 NCAA College Division basketball tournament involved 36 schools playing in a single-elimination tournament to determine the national champion of men's NCAA College Division basketball as a culmination of the 1965–66 NCAA College Division men's basketball season. It was won by Kentucky Wesleyan College, with Kentucky Wesleyan's Sam Smith named Most Outstanding Player.

Regional participants

*indicates a tie

Regionals

New England

Consolation March 2 - American International 96, Springfield 94*
Consolation March 3 - Le Moyne 86, Potsdam State 63

South - Durham, North Carolina
Location: McClendon–McDougald Gym Host: North Carolina College at Durham

Third Place - Winston-Salem 85, South Carolina State 81

East - Reading, Pennsylvania
Location: Bollman Center Host: Albright College

Third Place - Albright 78, Drexel 61

Mideast - Akron, Ohio
Location: Memorial Hall Host: Municipal University of Akron

Third Place - Youngstown State 94, Randolph–Macon 63

Pacific Coast - Fresno, California
Location: North Gym Host: Fresno State College

Third Place - Nevada 74, San Diego 71

Great Lakes - Carbondale, Illinois
Location: SIU Arena Host: Southern Illinois University

Third Place - Lamar 93, Indiana State 78

Southwest - Jonesboro, Arkansas
Location: Indian Fieldhouse Host: Arkansas State College

Third Place - Arkansas State 84, Jackson State 77

Midwest - Grand Forks, North Dakota
Location: Hyslop Sports Center Host: University of North Dakota

Note: The first-round game between North Dakota and Colorado State College was delayed a day to March 6th; the Valparaiso/Saint Procopius game was played in Moorhead, Minnesota on March 5; and the third-place game was cancelled entirely. These occurrences were due to inclement weather.

*denotes each overtime played

National Finals - Evansville, Indiana
Location: Roberts Municipal Stadium Host: Evansville College

Third Place - Akron 76, North Dakota 71

*denotes each overtime played

All-tournament team
 Phil Jackson (North Dakota)
 David Lee (Southern Illinois)
 George McNeil (Southern Illinois)
 Clarence Smith (Southern Illinois)
 Sam Smith (Kentucky Wesleyan)

See also
 1966 NCAA University Division basketball tournament
 1966 NAIA Basketball Tournament

References

Sources
 2010 NCAA Men's Basketball Championship Tournament Records and Statistics: Division II men's basketball Championship
 1966 NCAA College Division Men's Basketball Tournament jonfmorse.com

NCAA Division II men's basketball tournament
Tournament
NCAA College Division basketball tournament
NCAA College Division basketball tournament